Boraine is a surname. Notable people with the surname include:

Alex Boraine (1931–2018), South African politician and activist
Andrew Boraine (born 1959), South African expert on economic and urban development
Nick Boraine (born 1971), South African actor
Clyde Boraine (born 1988), South African born, Australian actor